The Rock railway station is a heritage-listed railway station and antique shop located on the Main South line in The Rock in the Lockhart Shire local government area of New South Wales, Australia. The station is also known as The Rock Station and yard group. The property was added to the New South Wales State Heritage Register on 2 April 1999.

History
The Rock railway station opened on 1 September 1880 as Hanging Rock when the Main South line was extended from Wagga Wagga to Gerogery. It was renamed Kingston on 28 December 1882, and finally The Rock on 10 February 1883.

On 8 July 1901, The Rock became a junction station with the opening of the Oaklands line as far as Lockhart. It gained a locomotive depot and carriage shed at the same time.

From the late 1950s, The Rock became a railmotor depot, gaining an allocation of four CPH railmotors that were used on all services south of Junee to Albury and on the Oaklands, Rand, Holbrook and Kywong lines. After these services were withdrawn in 1974, the depot was demolished in 1978.

Services
The Rock is served by two daily NSW TrainLink XPT services in each direction operating between Sydney and Melbourne. This is a request stop, so the train stops only if passengers booked to board/alight here.

Description 
The complex comprises a type 4 railway station building of standard roadside timber, erected in 1880; and a station master's, type 5 brick residence, erected in 1880. Other structures include a brick platform face, completed in 1880; a crane and platform; and platform signs.

Heritage listing 
The railway site is part of an area designated as an urban conservation area in the town. The railway contributes by forming a strong south-eastern boundary to the area intersecting the town at an oblique angle and crossing the significant main street also at an oblique angle. The station is located just off the axis of the main street and contributes a strong visual element to the form of the town. The station building dates from the period of the towns prosperity and is one of the few remaining unaltered structures from that period.

The Rock railway station was listed on the New South Wales State Heritage Register on 2 April 1999 having satisfied the following criteria.

The place possesses uncommon, rare or endangered aspects of the cultural or natural history of New South Wales.

This item is assessed as historically rare. This item is assessed as archaeologically rare. This item is assessed as socially rare.

See also 

List of regional railway stations in New South Wales

References

Bibliography

Attribution

External links

The Rock station details Transport for New South Wales

Railway stations in Australia opened in 1880
Regional railway stations in New South Wales
New South Wales State Heritage Register
Lockhart Shire
Retail buildings in New South Wales
Articles incorporating text from the New South Wales State Heritage Register
Main Southern railway line, New South Wales